Jorge Martínez may refer to:

Academics
Jorge Loring Martinez (1889–1936), Spanish engineer and entrepreneur

Arts and Entertainment
Jorge Martínez de Hoyos (1920–1997), Mexican actor
Jorge Martinez (Argentine actor) (born 1947), comedian in Chiquititas
Jorge "Lobito" Martínez (1952–2003), Paraguayan musician

Criminals
Jorge A. Martinez (born 1951), physician; received a sentence of life imprisonment in 2006 for submitting $60 million in claims for unnecessary procedures in the first prosecution in US history involving a charge of health care fraud resulting in death

Politics
Jorge Martínez Busch (1936–2011), Chilean naval officer, commander-in-chief 1990–1997
Jorge Martí Martínez (fl. 2003-2021), Cuban politician and diplomat
Jorge Estévez Martínez (fl. 2009-2021), Puerto Rican politician, mayor of Añasco

Sports
Jorge Martínez (football manager) (born 1960), Mexican former football manager
Jorge Martínez (motorcyclist) (born 1962), Spanish Grand Prix motorcycle road racer
Jorge Martínez (footballer, born 1973), Argentine international football defender
Jorge Humberto Martínez (born 1975), Colombian road cyclist
Jorge Martínez (footballer, born April 1983), Uruguayan international football midfielder
Jorge Martínez (footballer, born November 1983), Uruguayan football midfielder